Gynatrix is a genus of dioecious flowering plants in the family Malvaceae, endemic to south-east Australia.

There are two species within the genus:

Gynatrix pulchella (Willd.) Alef. – (Hemp bush, Aboriginal hemp), a shrub to 3 metres in height with white or cream flowers that occurs in New South Wales, the Australian Capital Territory, Victoria and Tasmania.
Gynatrix macrophylla N.G.Walsh – (Gippsland hemp bush), a rare shrub that occurs in eastern Victoria.

References

Malveae
Malvaceae genera
Malvales of Australia
Dioecious plants
Taxa named by Friedrich Alefeld